Carlos "Carlão" Alberto Santos (born February 14, 1976) is a 3-time World Brazilian Jiu-Jitsu heavyweight champion.

Career and accomplishments

In Rio de Janeiro, Brazil

Carlson Gracie Academy 
Carlos's Jiu-Jitsu career started in 1993 at the famous Carlson Gracie Academy in Copacabana, Rio de Janeiro, under the supervision of Marcelo Alonso and Marcelo Saporito. He trained under Carlson Gracie until receiving his brown belt.

Brazilian Top Team 
Thereafter, Carlos became a head coach of Brazilian Top Team (BTT), where he managed the Gi division. Carlão also trained with Luiz Carlos Dias ("Manimal"), Mario Sperry, Murilo Bustamante, Bebeo Duarte and Ricardo Libório. He received his black belt in August 2001. Carlos stayed with BTT until he moved to Abu Dhabi.

In Abu Dhabi, U.A.E.

Emirates Jiu-Jitsu & FIJJA 
Carlos Santos first visited Abu Dhabi, U.A.E., in January 2002, after the Abu Dhabi Combat Club (ADCC) struck a deal with Brazilian Top Team (BTT) in 2001. The terms of the deal directed BTT to send one of its coaches to Abu Dhabi every month for a one-month stay. After staying for a month on his first visit, Carlos moved to Abu Dhabi permanently in August 2002.

Carlos was the head coach of Emirates Jiu-Jitsu. The stated goal of Emirates Jiu-Jitsu is to raise awareness of Brazilian Jiu-Jitsu and make the United Arab Emirates the premier venue for this sport in the world, as well as create a community of BJJ athletes that train and compete in the UAE. He is also the President of the Federation International of Jiu-Jitsu Association (FIJJA) that he established in 2009. FIJJA aims at generating financial return to FIJJA and its competing athletes by making jiu-jitsu a profitable business.

School-Jitsu 
Carlos implemented BJJ in the local army training, as well as making Jiu Jitsu a mandatory subject in public schools. The Abu Dhabi Jiu-Jitsu Schools initiative, named "School-Jitsu", began in 2008. School-Jitsu and aimed to discover future talent in 14 schools for pupils in grades 6 and 7 (ages 9 to 13). The program has since expanded to 42 government schools, with 81 Brazilian coaches brought in as instructors. The plan is for up to 500 schools to be participating in the School-Jitsu program by 2015. The project was set up by special request of Sheikh Mohammad bin Zayed Al Nahyan to Carlos Santos, who is the managing director of the School-Jitsu Project.

World Professional Jiu-Jitsu Cup 
Carlos also works on promoting local and regional tournaments. In 2009, with full support of the local government, Carlos created the World Professional Jiu-Jitsu Cup (WPJJC) in Abu Dhabi. Since then, WPJCC drew hundreds of high caliber athletes every year, with qualifying athletes receiving all travel expenses to compete in Abu Dhabi. Carlos's ultimate goal is to make Brazilian Jiu-Jitsu a professional sport.

Relocation 
In May 2011, Santos returned to his home of Brazil after a nine-year stay in U.A.E.

Prime Jiu-Jitsu Center - BJJ in Colorado Springs - USA 
In February 2012, Carlos Santos launched the Prime Jiu-Jitsu Center in Colorado Springs.

First Brazilian Jiu-Jitsu - BJJ in Salt Lake City, UTAH, USA 
On July 11, 2014, Carlos Santos launched the First Brazilian Jiu-Jitsu in Salt Lake City, UT .

Sport accomplishments
 2004 European Champion
 2nd Place Team Brazilian Champion 2002
 2nd Place Brazilian Champion 2003 - Black Belt
 2nd Place Brazilian Champion 2001 - Black Belt
 2 times  Pan American Champion 2000 and 2001
 World Champion 2000 (defeated Walter Pinto)
 World Champion 1998 (defeated Rolles Gracie)
 World Champion 1996 (defeated Fabio Martins)
 Brazilian Champion 1996
 Brazilian Champion 1995
 2nd Place in Brazilian Championship 1994

References

External links
Interview with On The Mat

1976 births
Living people
Brazilian practitioners of Brazilian jiu-jitsu
People awarded a black belt in Brazilian jiu-jitsu
Sportspeople from Rio de Janeiro (city)